In folklore, a will-o'-the-wisp, will-o'-wisp or ignis fatuus (plural ignes fatui), is an atmospheric ghost light seen by travellers at night, especially over bogs, swamps or marshes.  The phenomenon is known in English folk belief, English folklore and much of European folklore by a variety of names, including jack-o'-lantern, friar's lantern, and hinkypunk and is said to mislead travellers by resembling a flickering lamp or lantern. In literature, will-o'-the-wisp metaphorically refers to a hope or goal that leads one on, but is impossible to reach, or something one finds strange or sinister.

Wills-o'-the-wisp appear in folk tales and traditional legends of numerous countries and cultures; notable wills-o'-the-wisp include St. Louis Light in Saskatchewan, the Spooklight in Southwestern Missouri and Northeastern Oklahoma, the Marfa lights of Texas, the Naga fireballs on the Mekong in Thailand, the Paulding Light in Upper Peninsula of Michigan and the Hessdalen light in Norway.

In urban legends, folklore and superstition,  wills-o'-the-wisp are typically attributed to ghosts, fairies or elemental spirits. Modern science explains the light aspect as natural phenomena such as bioluminescence or chemiluminescence, caused by the oxidation of phosphine (PH3), diphosphane (P2H4) and methane (CH4) produced by organic decay.

Etymology

The term "will-o'-the-wisp" comes from "wisp", a bundle of sticks or paper sometimes used as a torch and the name "Will", thus meaning "Will of the torch". The term jack-o'-lantern (Jack of the lantern) originally referred to a will-o'-the-wisp. In the United States, they are often called "spook-lights", "ghost-lights", or "orbs" by folklorists and paranormal enthusiasts.

Despite its Latin origins, the term ignis fatuus is not attested in antiquity, and what the ancient Romans called the will-o'-wisp may be unknown. The term is not attested in the Middle Ages either. Instead, the Latin  is documented no earlier than the 16th century in Germany, where it was coined by a German humanist, and appears to be a free translation of the long-existing German name  ("wandering light" or "deceiving light") conceived of in German folklore as a mischievous spirit of nature; the Latin translation was made to lend the German name intellectual credibility. Beside , the will-o'-the-wisp has also been called in German  (where  translates to "wisp"), as found in e.g. Martin Luther's writings of the same 16th century.

Folklore

Folk belief attributes the phenomenon to fairies or elemental spirits, explicitly in the term "hobby lanterns" found in the 19th century Denham Tracts. In her book A Dictionary of Fairies, K. M. Briggs provides an extensive list of other names for the same phenomenon, though the place where they are observed (graveyard, bogs, etc.) influences the naming considerably. When observed in graveyards, they are known as "ghost candles", also a term from the Denham Tracts.

The names will-o'-the-wisp and jack-o'-lantern are used in etiological folk-tales, recorded in many variant forms in Ireland, Scotland, England, Wales, Appalachia, and Newfoundland. In these tales, protagonists named either Will or Jack are doomed to haunt the marshes with a light for some misdeed. One version from Shropshire is recounted by Briggs in A Dictionary of Fairies and refers to Will Smith. Will is a wicked blacksmith who is given a second chance by Saint Peter at the gates of heaven, but leads such a bad life that he ends up being doomed to wander the earth. The Devil provides him with a single burning coal with which to warm himself, which he then uses to lure foolish travellers into the marshes.

An Irish version of the tale has a ne'er-do-well named Drunk Jack or Stingy Jack who, when the Devil comes to collect his soul, tricks him into turning into a coin, so he can pay for his one last drink. When the Devil obliges, Jack places him in his pocket next to a crucifix, preventing him from returning to his original form. In exchange for his freedom, the Devil grants Jack ten more years of life. When the term expires, the Devil comes to collect his due. But Jack tricks him again by making him climb a tree and then carving a cross underneath, preventing him from climbing down. In exchange for removing the cross, the Devil forgives Jack's debt. However, no one as bad as Jack would ever be allowed into heaven, so Jack is forced upon his death to travel to hell and ask for a place there. The Devil denies him entrance in revenge but grants him an ember from the fires of hell to light his way through the twilight world to which lost souls are forever condemned. Jack places it in a carved turnip to serve as a lantern. Another version of the tale is "Willy the Whisp", related in Irish Folktales by Henry Glassie. Séadna by Peadar Ua Laoghaire is yet another version—and also the first modern novel in the Irish language.

Americas

Mexico has two equivalents as well. In one they are called brujas (witches), folklore explains the phenomenon to be witches who transformed into these lights. The reason for this, however, varies according to the region. Another explanation refers to the lights as indicators to places where gold or hidden treasures are buried which can be found only with the help of children, in this one they are called luces del dinero (money lights) or luces del tesoro (treasure lights).

The swampy area of Massachusetts known as the Bridgewater Triangle has folklore of ghostly orbs of light, and there have been modern observations of these ghost-lights in this area as well.

The fifollet (or feu-follet) of Louisiana derives from the French. The legend says that the fifollet is a soul sent back from the dead to do God's penance, but instead attacks people for vengeance. While it mostly takes part in harmless mischievous acts, the fifollet sometimes sucked the blood of children. Some legends say that it was the soul of a child who died before baptism.

Boi-tatá is the Brazilian equivalent of the will-o'-the-wisp. Regionally it is called Boitatá, Baitatá, Batatá, Bitatá, Batatão, Biatatá, M'boiguaçu, Mboitatá and Mbaê-Tata. The name comes from the Old Tupi language and means "fiery serpent" (mboî tatá). Its great fiery eyes leave it almost blind by day, but by night, it can see everything. According to legend, Boi-tatá was a big serpent which survived a great deluge. A "boiguaçu" (a cave anaconda) left its cave after the deluge and, in the dark, went through the fields preying on the animals and corpses, eating exclusively its favourite morsel, the eyes. The collected light from the eaten eyes gave "Boitatá" its fiery gaze. Not really a dragon but a giant snake (in the native language, "boa" or "mboi" or "mboa").

In Argentina and Uruguay the will-o'-the-wisp phenomenon is known as luz mala (evil light) and is one of the most important myths in both countries' folklore. This phenomenon is quite feared and is mostly seen in rural areas. It consists of an extremely shiny ball of light floating a few inches from the ground.

In Colombia, La Candileja is the will-o'-the-wisp ghost of a vicious grandmother who raised her grandchildren without morals, and as such they became thieves and murderers. In the afterlife the grandmother's spirit was condemned to wander the world surrounded in flames.

In Trinidad and Tobago a Soucouyant is a "fireball witch" that is literally a witch that takes on the form of a flame at night. This spirit is, like the other versions, evil – it enters homes through any gap it can find, and drinks the blood of its victims.

Asia

Aleya (or marsh ghost-light) is the name given to a strange light phenomena occurring over the marshes as observed by Bengalis, especially the fishermen of Bangladesh and West Bengal. This marsh light is attributed to some kind of marsh gas apparitions that confuse fishermen, make them lose their bearings, and may even lead to drowning if one decided to follow them moving over the marshes. Local communities in the region believe that these strange hovering marsh-lights are in fact Ghost-lights representing the ghosts of fisherman who died fishing. Sometimes they confuse the fishermen, and sometimes they help them avoid future dangers.

Chir batti (ghost-light), also spelled chhir batti or cheer batti, is a strange dancing light phenomenon occurring on dark nights reported from the Banni grasslands, its seasonal marshy wetlands and the adjoining desert of the marshy salt flats of the Rann of Kutch near Indo-Pakistani border in Kutch district, Gujarat State, India. Local villagers have been seeing these sometimes hovering, sometimes flying balls of lights since time immemorial and call it Chir Batti in their Kutchhi–Sindhi language, with Chir meaning ghost and Batti meaning light.

Other varieties (and sources) of ghost-lights appear in folklore across of India, including the Kollivay Pey of Tamil Nadu and Karnataka, the Kuliyande Choote of Kerala, and many variants from different tribes in Northeast India.

Similar phenomena are described in Japanese folklore, including Hitodama (literally "Human Soul" as a ball of energy), Hi no Tama (Ball of Flame), Aburagae, Koemonbi, Ushionibi, etc. All these phenomena are described as balls of flame or light, at times associated with graveyards, but occurring across Japan as a whole in a wide variety of situations and locations. Kitsune, mythical yokai demons, are also associated with will 'o the wisp, with the marriage of two kitsune producing kitsune-bi (狐火), literally meaning 'fox-fire'. These phenomena are described in Shigeru Mizuki's 1985 book Graphic World of Japanese Phantoms (妖怪伝 in Japanese).

In Korea, sightings of blue-white light at night are said to have been quite commonly reported even up to the 1960s. The lightballs were usually seen flaming and hovering over rice paddies, near old trees, in mountains or even in some houses and were called 'dokkebi bul(Korean: 도깨비 불)', meaning 'goblin fire (or goblin light)' in folklore terms. They were deemed malevolent and impish, as they confused and lured passerbys to lose their way or fall into pits at night.

China
Medieval Chinese polymath Sheng Gua may have recorded such a phenomenon in the Book of Dreams, stating, "In the middle of the reign of emperor Jia You, at Yanzhou, in the Jiangsu province, an enormous pearl was seen especially in gloomy weather. At first it appeared in the marsh… and disappeared finally in the Xinkai Lake." It was described as very bright, illuminating the surrounding countryside and was a reliable phenomenon over ten years, an elaborate Pearl Pavilion being built by local inhabitants for those who wished to observe it.

Europe

In European folklore, these lights are believed to be spirits of the dead, fairies, or a variety of other supernatural beings which attempt to lead travellers to their demise. Sometimes the lights are believed to be the spirits of un-baptized or stillborn children, flitting between heaven and hell.

In Sweden, the will-o'-the-wisp represents the soul of an unbaptized person "trying to lead travellers to water in the hope of being baptized".

Danes, Finns, Swedes, Estonians, Latvians, Lithuanians, and Irish people and amongst some other groups believed that a will-o'-the-wisp also marked the location of a treasure deep in ground or water, which could be taken only when the fire was there. Sometimes magical tricks, and even dead man's hand, were required as well, to uncover the treasure. In Finland and several other northern countries, it was believed that early autumn was the best time to search for wills-o'-the-wisp and treasures below them. It was believed that when someone hid treasure, in the ground, he made the treasure available only at the Saint John's Day, and set will-o'-the-wisp to mark the exact place and time so that he could come to take the treasure back. For then he could be fulfilled with treasures.

The Aarnivalkea (also known as virvatuli, aarretuli and aarreliekki), in Finnish mythology, are spots where an eternal flame associated with wills o' the wisp burns. They are claimed to mark the places where faerie gold is buried. They are protected by a glamour that would prevent anyone finding them by pure chance. However, if one finds a fern seed from a mythical flowering fern, the magical properties of that seed will lead the fortunate person to these treasures, in addition to providing one with a glamour of invisibility. Since in reality the fern produces no flower and reproduces via spores under the leaves, the myth specifies that it blooms only extremely rarely.

Britain

The will-o'-the-wisp can be found in numerous folk tales around the United Kingdom, and is often a malicious character in the stories. In Welsh folklore, it is said that the light is "fairy fire" held in the hand of a púca, or pwca, a small goblin-like fairy that mischievously leads lone travellers off the beaten path at night. As the traveller follows the púca through the marsh or bog, the fire is extinguished, leaving them lost. The púca is said to be one of the Tylwyth Teg, or fairy family. In Wales the light predicts a funeral that will take place soon in the locality. Wirt Sikes in his book British Goblins mentions the following Welsh tale about púca.

A peasant travelling home at dusk sees a bright light travelling along ahead of him. Looking closer, he sees that the light is a lantern held by a "dusky little figure", which he follows for several miles. All of a sudden he finds himself standing on the edge of a vast chasm with a roaring torrent of water rushing below him. At that precise moment the lantern-carrier leaps across the gap, lifts the light high over its head, lets out a malicious laugh and blows out the light, leaving the poor peasant a long way from home, standing in pitch darkness at the edge of a precipice. This is a fairly common cautionary tale concerning the phenomenon; however, the ignis fatuus was not always considered dangerous. There are some tales told about the will-o'-the-wisp being guardians of treasure, much like the Irish leprechaun leading those brave enough to follow them to sure riches. Other stories tell of travellers getting lost in the woodland and coming upon a will-o'-the-wisp, and depending on how they treated the will-o'-the-wisp, the spirit would either get them lost further in the woods or guide them out.

Also related, the Pixy-light from Devon and Cornwall is most often associated with the Pixie who often has "pixie-led" travellers away from the safe and reliable route and into the bogs with glowing lights. "Like Poltergeist they can generate uncanny sounds. They were less serious than their German Weiße Frauen kin, frequently blowing out candles on unsuspecting courting couples or producing obscene kissing sounds, which were always misinterpreted by parents." Pixy-Light was also associated with "lambent light" which the Old Norse might have seen guarding their tombs. In Cornish folklore, Pixy-Light also has associations with the Colt pixie. "A colt pixie is a pixie that has taken the shape of a horse and enjoys playing tricks such as neighing at the other horses to lead them astray". In Guernsey, the light is known as the faeu boulanger (rolling fire), and is believed to be a lost soul. On being confronted with the spectre, tradition prescribes two remedies. The first is to turn one's cap or coat inside out. This has the effect of stopping the faeu boulanger in its tracks. The other solution is to stick a knife into the ground, blade up. The faeu, in an attempt to kill itself, will attack the blade.

The will-o'-the-wisp was also known as the Spunkie in the Scottish Highlands where it would take the form of a linkboy (a boy who carried a flaming torch to light the way for pedestrians in exchange for a fee), or else simply a light that always seemed to recede, in order to lead unwary travellers to their doom. The spunkie has also been blamed for shipwrecks at night after being spotted on land and mistaken for a harbour light. Other tales of Scottish folklore regard these mysterious lights as omens of death or the ghosts of once living human beings. They often appeared over lochs or on roads along which funeral processions were known to travel. A strange light sometimes seen in the Hebrides is referred to as the teine sith, or "fairy light", though there was no formal connection between it and the fairy race.

Oceania

The Australian equivalent, known as the Min Min light is reportedly seen in parts of the outback after dark. The majority of sightings are reported to have occurred in the Channel Country region.

Stories about the lights can be found in aboriginal myth pre-dating western settlement of the region and have since become part of wider Australian folklore. Indigenous Australians hold that the number of sightings has increased alongside the increasing ingression of Europeans into the region. According to folklore, the lights sometimes followed or approached people and have disappeared when fired upon, only to reappear later on.

Natural explanations

Science proposes that will-o'-the-wisp phenomena (ignis fatuus) are caused by the oxidation of phosphine (PH3), diphosphane (P2H4), and methane (CH4). These compounds, produced by organic decay, can cause photon emissions. Since phosphine and diphosphane mixtures spontaneously ignite on contact with the oxygen in air, only small quantities of it would be needed to ignite the much more abundant methane to create ephemeral fires. Furthermore, phosphine produces phosphorus pentoxide as a by-product, which forms phosphoric acid upon contact with water vapor, which can explain "viscous moisture" sometimes described as accompanying ignis fatuus.

The idea of the will-o'-the-wisp phenomena being caused by natural gases can be found as early as 1596, as mentioned in the book Of Ghostes and Spirites, Walking by Night, And of Straunge Noyses, Crackes, and Sundrie forewarnings, which commonly happen before the death of men: Great Slaughters, and alterations of Kingdomes, by Ludwig Lavater, in the chapter titled "That many naturall things are taken to be ghoasts": Many times candles & small fires appeare in the night, and seeme to runne up and downe... Sometime these fires goe alone in the night season, and put such as see them, as they travel by night, in great feare. But these things, and many such lyke have their naturall causes... Natural Philosophers write, that thicke exhilations aryse out of the earth, and are kindled. Mynes full of sulphur and brimstone, if the aire enter unto it, as it lyeth in the holes and veines of the earth, will kindle on fier, and strive to get out. In 1776, Alessandro Volta first proposed that natural electrical phenomena (like lightning) interacting with methane marsh gas may be the cause of ignis fatuus. This was supported by the British polymath Joseph Priestley in his series of works Experiments and Observations on Different Kinds of Air (1772–1790); and by the French physicist Pierre Bertholon de Saint-Lazare in De l’électricité des météores (1787).

Early critics of the marsh gas hypothesis often dismissed it on various grounds including the unlikeliness of spontaneous combustion, the absence of warmth in some observed ignis fatuus, the odd behavior of ignis fatuus receding upon being approached, and the differing accounts of ball lightning (which was also classified as a kind of ignis fatuus). An example of such criticism is the following by the American anthropologist John G. Owens in Folk-Lore from Buffalo Valley (1891):

This is a name that is sometimes applied to a phenomenon perhaps more frequently called Jack-o'-the-Lantern, or Will-o'-the-Wisp. It seems to be a ball of fire, varying in size from that of a candle-flame to that of a man's head. It is generally observed in damp, marshy places, moving to and fro; but it has been known to stand perfectly still and send off scintillations. As you approach it, it will move on, keeping just beyond your reach; if you retire, it will follow you. That these fireballs do occur, and that they will repeat your motion, seems to be established, but no satisfactory explanation has yet been offered that I have heard. Those who are less superstitious say that it is the ignition of the gases rising from the marsh. But how a light produced from burning gas could have the form described and move as described, advancing as you advance, receding as you recede, and at other times remaining stationary, without having any visible connection with the earth, is not clear to me.

However, the apparent retreat of ignis fatuus upon being approached might be explained simply by the agitation of the air by nearby moving objects, causing the gases to disperse. This was observed in the very detailed accounts of several close interactions with ignis fatuus published earlier in 1832 by Major Louis Blesson after a series of experiments in various localities where they were known to occur. Of note is his first encounter with ignis fatuus in a marshland between a deep valley in the forest of Gorbitz, Newmark, Germany. Blesson observed that the water was covered by an iridescent film, and during day-time, bubbles could be observed rising abundantly from certain areas. At night, Blesson observed bluish-purple flames in the same areas and concluded that it was connected to the rising gas. He spent several days investigating the phenomenon, finding to his dismay that the flames retreated every time he tried to approach them. He eventually succeeded and was able to confirm that the lights were indeed caused by ignited gas. The British scientist Charles Tomlinson in On Certain Low-Lying Meteors (1893) describes Blesson's experiments as thus:

On visiting the spot at night, the sensitive flames retired as the major advanced; but on standing quite still, they returned, and he tried to light a piece of paper at them, but the current of air produced by his breath kept them at too great a distance. On turning away his head, and screening his breath, he succeeded in setting fire to the paper. He was also able to extinguish the flame by driving it before him to a part of the ground where no gas was produced; then applying a flame to the place whence the gas issued, a kind of explosion was heard over eight or nine square feet of the marsh; a red light was seen, which faded to a blue flame about three feet high and this continued to burn with an unsteady motion. As the morning dawned the flames became pale and they seemed to approach nearer and nearer to the earth, until at last they faded from sight.

Blesson also observed differences in the colour and heat of the flames in different marshes. The ignis fatuus in Malapane, Upper Silesia (now Ozimek, Poland) could be ignited and extinguished, but were unable to burn pieces of paper or wood shavings. Similarly, the ignis fatuus in another forest in Poland coated pieces of paper and wood shavings with an oily viscous fluid instead of burning them. Blesson also accidentally created ignis fatuus in the marshes of Porta Westfalica, Germany, while launching fireworks.

One attempt to replicate ignis fatuus under laboratory conditions was in 1980 by British geologist Alan A. Mills of Leicester University. Though he did succeed in creating a cool glowing cloud by mixing crude phosphine and natural gas, the color of the light was green and it produced copious amounts of acrid smoke. This was contrary to most eyewitness accounts of ignis fatuus. As an alternative, Mills proposed in 2000 that ignis fatuus may instead be cold flames. These are luminescent pre-combustion halos that occur when various compounds are heated to just below ignition point. Cold flames are indeed typically bluish in color and as their name suggests, they generate very little heat. Cold flames occur in a wide variety of compounds, including hydrocarbons (including methane), alcohols, aldehydes, oils, acids, and even waxes. However it is unknown if cold flames occur naturally, though a lot of compounds which exhibit cold flames are the natural byproducts of organic decay.

A related hypothesis involves the natural chemiluminescence of phosphine. In 2008, the Italian chemists Luigi Garlaschelli and Paolo Boschetti attempted to recreate Mills' experiments. They successfully created a faint cool light by mixing phosphine with air and nitrogen. Though the glow was still greenish in colour, Garlaschelli and Boschetti noted that under low-light conditions, the human eye cannot easily distinguish between colours. Furthermore, by adjusting the concentrations of the gases and the environmental conditions (temperature, humidity, etc.), it was possible to eliminate the smoke and smell, or at least render it to undetectable levels. Garlaschelli and Boschetti also agreed with Mills that cold flames may also be a plausible explanation for other instances of ignis fatuus.

In 1993, professors Derr and Persinger proposed that some ignis fatuus may be geologic in origin, piezoelectrically generated under tectonic strain. The strains that move faults would also heat up the rocks, vaporizing the water in them. Rock or soil containing something piezoelectric, like quartz, silicon, or arsenic, may also produce electricity, channelled up to the surface through the soil via a column of vaporized water, there somehow appearing as earth lights. This would explain why the lights appear electrical, erratic, or even intelligent in their behaviour.

The will-o'-the-wisp phenomena may occur due to the bioluminescence of various forest dwelling micro-organisms and insects.  The eerie glow emitted from certain fungal species, such as the honey fungus, during chemical reactions to form white rot could be mistaken for the mysterious will-o'-the-wisp or foxfire lights.  There are many other bioluminescent organisms that could create the illusions of fairy lights, such as fireflies.  Light reflecting off larger forest dwelling creatures could explain the phenomenon of will-o'-the-wisp moving and reacting to other lights.  The white plumage of Barn owls may reflect enough light from the moon to appear as a will-o'-the-wisp; hence the possibility of the lights moving, reacting to other lights, etc.

Ignis fatuus sightings are rarely reported today. The decline is believed to be the result of the draining and reclamation of swamplands in recent centuries, such as the formerly vast Fenlands of eastern England which have now been converted to farmlands.

In culture

Literature
In literature, will-o'-the-wisp sometimes has a metaphorical meaning, describing a hope or goal that leads one on but is impossible to reach, or something one finds sinister and confounding. In Book IX of John Milton's Paradise Lost, lines 631–642, Satan is compared to a will-o-the-wisp when he leads Eve to the Tree of Knowledge of good and evil.

[As] a flame,
Which oft, they say, some evil Spirit attends,
Hovering and blazing with delusive light,
Misleads the amazed night-wanderer from his way
To bogs and mires, and oft through pond or pool;
There swallowed up and lost, from succour far.
—9.631–642

Two Wills-o-the-wisp appear in Johann Wolfgang von Goethe's fairy tale The Green Snake and the Beautiful Lily (1795). They are described as lights which consume gold and are capable of shaking gold pieces again from themselves.

Emily Dickinson's "Those – dying then," a poem about the absence of God and the abdication of belief, closes with the lines "Better an ignis fatuus / Than no illume at all —".

It is seen in Charlotte Brontë's Jane Eyre when Jane Eyre is unsure if it is a candle or a Will-o-the-wisp.

"Mother Carey" wrote a popular 19th-century poem titled "Will-O'-The-Wisp".

The Will o' the wisp makes an appearance in the first chapter of Bram Stoker's Dracula, as the Count, masquerading as his own coach driver, takes Jonathan Harker to his castle in the night. The following night, when Harker asks Dracula about the lights, the Count makes reference to a common folk belief about the phenomenon by saying that they mark where treasure is buried.

In Lewis Carroll's The Hunting of the Snark (1876), the term is part of the description of the Snark: "The first is the taste, // Which is meagre and hollow, but crisp: // Like a coat that is rather too tight in the waist, // With a flavour of Will-o’-the-wisp."

"Will o' the wisp" was the anonymous author of Paper Lantern for Puseyites, published in 1843 by Smith, Elder & Co., London. In that anti-Tractarian skit, the hero, the Rev. Hilary Oriel, writes an account to his friend Clement Loyola of his proposed alterations in his church.

In J. R. R. Tolkien's work The Lord of the Rings, wills o' the wisp are present in the Dead Marshes outside of Mordor. When Frodo Baggins and Samwise Gamgee make their way through the bogs the spindly creature Gollum tells them "not to follow the lights", meaning the wills o' the wisp. He tells them that if they do, they will "keep the dead company" and "have little candles of their own".

The hinkypunk, the name for a will o' the wisp in South West England has achieved fame as a magical beast in JK Rowling's Harry Potter series. In the books, a hinkypunk is a one-legged, frail-looking creature that appears to be made of smoke. It is said to carry a lantern and mislead travellers.

The children's fantasy series The Spiderwick Chronicles, by Holly Black and Tony DiTerlizzi, includes wills o'the wisp; they are listed in "Arthur Spiderwick's Guide to the Fantastical World Around You." In the series, wills o' the wisp are described as fat fireflies that lead travellers astray.

The German fantasy novel by Michael Ende The Neverending Story (German: Die unendliche Geschichte 1979 and Ralph Manheim's English translation 1983) begins in Fantastica, when a will-o'-the-wisp goes to ask the Childlike Empress for help against the Nothing, which is spreading over the land. The film based on the book does not contain the Will-o'-the-wisp.

Civil War Confederate soldier and author Sam Watkins writes in his war memoir, "Co. Aytch", about witnessing "jack-o-lanterns (ignis fatui)" while standing watch late in the night near Corinth, Mississippi in early October 1862.

American historian and historical novelist Frances Fuller Victor ends her poem "A Letter" with—

We tread on thorns where we saw only roses,
And find an ignis fatuus in a star.

Music
In classical music, one of Franz Liszt's most challenging piano studies (the Transcendental Etude No. 5), known for its flighty and mysterious quality, bears the title "Feux Follets" (the French term for Will-o'-the-wisp). The phenomenon also appears in "Canción del fuego fatuo" ('Song of the will-o'-the-wisp') in Manuel de Falla's ballet El amor brujo, later covered by Miles Davis as "Will-O'-The-Wisp" on Sketches Of Spain. The German name of the phenomenon, Irrlicht, has been the name of a song by the classical composer Franz Schubert in his song cycle Winterreise. Additionally, the first solo album of electronic musician Klaus Schulze is named Irrlicht. Part 3, Scene 12 of Hector Berlioz' "The Damnation of Faust" is entitled "Menuet des follets" - "Minuet of the Wills-o'-the-Wisp". Finally, the second piece in Edward MacDowell's Woodland Sketches is titled "Will-o-the-Wisp" and reflects other composer's portrayal of the phenomena as mysterious.

The 2016 album Sorceress by Swedish band Opeth, contains the track "Will O The Wisp", using the term 'wisp' as a short form of whispering.

Several bands have written songs about or referring to wills-o'-the-wisp, such as K-pop girl groups Aespa and Le Sserafim with their respective songs "Illusion" and "Blue Flame", Magnolia Electric Co., Verdunkeln, Leon Russell and Steve Howe. The will-o'-the-wisp is also referred to during the song "Maria" in The Sound of Music.

"Will-o-the-wisp" is the opening track on the Pet Shop Boys 2020 album "Hotspot", in which the narrator (Neil Tennant) describes visions of a phantom lover from the past riding on an elevated train overhead.

Visual media
Will-o'-the-wisp phenomena have appeared in numerous computer games (such as Ori and the Will of the Wisps, Castlevania, Runescape, Ultima, EverQuest, the Quest for Glory series, Warcraft series and the Elder Scrolls series) and tabletop games (including Dungeons & Dragons, Magic: The Gathering and Small World Underground), frequently with reference to folklore of the phenomena misleading or harming travellers. The Final Fantasy series also pays tribute to the tradition of a will-o'-the-wisp being a lantern-carrying individual, with the Tonberry creature. The Will o the Wisp is also a monster in Chrono Cross that either moves away from the character as they approach or follows them when they walk away. It is seen in areas relating to the dead. In the Pokémon game series, the Fire-type move "Will-O-Wisp", introduced in Generation III, can inflict a burn on the opponent and is often learned by Ghost types. The character of Wisp from the Animal Crossing series is also named after the Will-o'-the-Wisp and references the phenomenon by being a ghost. In the Mana series, Wisp is one of the eight Mana spirits, representing the element of light. In Secret of Evermore, a spin-off of the Mana series, Wills-o'-the-Wisp are small flame enemies located in a swamp area that move erratically toward the player.

In television, Willo the Wisp appeared as a short cartoon series on BBC TV in the 1980s, voiced by Kenneth Williams.

In Lost Girl season one episode two, Bo and Kenzi meet a Will of the wisp who appears as a shaggy hobo and uses blue fire (foxfire) to confuse trespassers in his forest home.

"Will O' The Wisp" is also the name of the 13th episode in season one of Disney channel's So Weird in which one of the main characters, Jack, is possessed by a will-o'-the-wisp while visiting the ghost lights festival in Marfa, Texas.

The Disney/Pixar short Mater and the Ghostlight features a Will-o'-the-wisp aptly named "the Ghostlight", described as a glowing orb of blue light.

Wills-o'-the-wisp play a prominent role in the Disney/Pixar film Brave. In a break from the usual characterization, these wills-o'-the-wisp appear benevolent or at least neutral in nature. They are hinted to be spirits of the dead, who aid the living by leading them towards their destinies.

Will-o'-the-wisp (renamed to Isaribi) is also the name of the reddish ship owned by Tekadan in the Japanese anime series Mobile Suit Gundam: Iron-Blooded Orphans.

Reported light locations

Americas
Canada
 Fireship of Baie des Chaleurs in New Brunswick
 St. Louis Light in Saskatchewan

United States
 Arbyrd/Senath Light of Missouri
 Bragg Road ghost light (Light of Saratoga) of Texas
 Brown Mountain Lights of North Carolina
 Gurdon light of Arkansas
 Hornet ghost light (The Spooklight) of Missouri-Oklahoma state line
 Maco light of North Carolina
 Marfa lights of Texas
 Paulding Light of Michigan's Upper Peninsula
 Northeast of Pflugerville, Texas
 Cohoke Light of eastern Virginia’s Cohoke Swamp wetlands

Argentina and Uruguay
 Luz Mala

Asia
 Chir Batti in Kutch district, Gujarat
 Naga fireballs on the Mekong in Thailand
 Aleya in Bengal

Europe
 Hessdalen light, Norway
 Martebo lights, Sweden
 Paasselkä devil, Finland
 Ballybar, near Carlow, Ireland
 Ferbane, County Offaly, Ireland
 Romney Marsh in England
 Bewdley, Worcestershire in England
 Dwaallichtjes in the Netherlands and Belgium
 Sheeries, Ireland
 Liam na lasóige, Ireland

Oceania
 Min Min light of Outback Australia

See also

 Apparition
 Biogas
 Chir Batti
 Corpse road
 Foo fighter
 Halloween
 Hessdalen Lights
 Kitsunebi
 Lantern man
 Lidérc
 Naga fireball
 Omphalotus olearius
 Orb (optics)
 Santelmo
 Simonside Dwarfs
 St. Elmo's fire
 The Spooklight
 Yan-gant-y-tan
 Marsh gas

Notes

References

 The Denham Tracts by Michael Denham
 The Haunted Abbot by Peter Tremayne
 Remarkable Luminous Phenomena in Nature by William Corliss
 Het dwaallicht by Willem Elsschot

External links
 The Ignis Erraticus - A Bibliographic Survey of the names of the Will-'o-the-wisp

Atmospheric ghost lights
European folklore
Ghosts
Marshes
Methane
European ghosts
Supernatural legends
Folklore
Wetlands
Pixies